Zhuangyuan Subdistrict is a subdistrict in Longwan District, Wenzhou, Zhejiang province, China. , it administers the following three residential neighborhoods and six villages:
Neighborhoods
Longyue Community
Longteng Community
Luoxi Community

Villages
Zhuangyuanqiao Village
Hengjie Village
Yushiqiao Village
Shanxi'ao Village
Xitai Village
Shitan Village

See also 
 List of township-level divisions of Zhejiang

References 

Township-level divisions of Zhejiang
Geography of Wenzhou
Subdistricts of the People's Republic of China